Whitsett Historic District is a national historic district located at Perry Township, Fayette County, Pennsylvania.  The district includes 48 contributing buildings and 5 contributing structures in the bituminous coal mining community of Whitsett. Most of the contributing buildings were built between 1890 and 1917, and 31 of the contributing buildings are two-story, frame duplex workers housing.  The oldest building is the Whitsett farmhouse, built about 1845.  Other buildings and structures include three mine manager's dwellings, two brick former mine buildings, the former company store annex, the former water pumphouse, the remains of the Banning Mine No. 2 entrance, foundation of the Banning Mine No. 2 tipple complex, the mine slate dump, beehive coke oven battery, and the abandoned Pittsburgh and Lake Erie Connellsville Branch.

It was added to the National Register of Historic Places in 1995.

References

Historic districts on the National Register of Historic Places in Pennsylvania
Historic districts in Fayette County, Pennsylvania
National Register of Historic Places in Fayette County, Pennsylvania